Panki Block is one of the administrative blocks of Palamu district, Jharkhand, a state in India. According to census records (2001), the block has 21,687 households with aggregate population of 123,820. The block has 200 villages.

History 
Panki, a Taluka/Block close to Medininager Palamu, is located 44 km from Medninagar (Daltonganj). Panki is a part of Panki (Vidhan Sabha constituency), and is located 44 km east of Daltonganj. Panki is a junction point for Chatra, Jharkhand, Balumath (community development block) and Medininagar (Daltonganj). This is one of the developing taluka of Palamu.

It's well covered by Vodafone, Airtel, Uninor, Reliance, BSNL, Aircel, Idea, Airtel 4G,Jio 4G, like cellular networks. ATM also available here for SBI near Panki Bazar and pnb ATM near to panki police station.

In panki Block and police station Most populated and famous village near to the town are, Tetrai, Konwai and Salgas, Sagalim on road in the way to Daltonganj city.

Administration

Villages 

Panki mandal/Block consists of 140 villages. The following is a list of villages in the Block:

Abun
Ahirgurha
Ambabar
Ambalori
Angara
Aparmanri
Ara
Asarhia
Aseahar
Auka
Bahera
Baherwatanr
Baida (village)
Balmuwan
Baludih
Banai
Bandubar
Baniadih
Banki Kalan
Banki Khurd
Banri Pakariya
Bara
Barkadaha
Barodiri
Barwadih
Barwaiya
Basariya
Basdiha
Bela
Bhang
Bhanwardah
Bhari
Bhuinya Kurha
Bidra
Bidra
Bihari Khap
Bihra
Birbir
Biritiya Dandar
Birtia
Biru
Bochdohar
Burhabar
Burhi
Chandarpur
Chandarpur
Chandwar
Chanpi Kalan
Chanpi Khurd
Chauphal
Chhapar
Chorea
Dandar Kalan
Daryapur
Dema
Dhub
Dundar Khurd
Duriatu
Duwarika
Ganeshpur
Garhganw
Giri
Gogar
Gongo
Gopaldih
Gorihara
Gudipahari
Haldiminhai
Harkhuwa
Harlaung
Harna
Hatwar
Herum
Hesatu
Hiringbar
Hoiyo
Husenigurh Alias Misir Gurha
Hutai
Irgu
Janjo
Jaspur
Jaspur Alias Cheribar
Jhagrudih
Jiro
Jobla
Jolah Bigha
Jotang
Kakargarh
Kamal
Kamat
Kamtola
Kaparphuta
Karar
Karma
Kasmar
Kelwa
Kerki
Khajuri
Khankhar
Khap
Khapar Manda
Kolhua
Korwatanr
Koseri
Kotiya
Kunwai
Kusri
Lawabar
Loharsi
Lukuwa
Mahe
Mahugain
Mahugain
Majhauli
Mangarpur
Manhi Pipra
Manran
Maran
Matnag
Matuli
Maulaganj
Mukta
Nagri
Naudiha
Naudiha
Nawa Garh
Nawadih
Nima Chak
Nuru
Pachamba
Pagar
Pakariya
Panki
Parasia
Pardohar
Parhiya Tola
Parsawan
Parsotimpur
Pathra Kalan
Phulwaria
Pipra Kalan
Pipratanr
Pokhraha
Porsam
Pundru
Puraini
Radhadih
Ranadah
Ranne
Ratanpur
Rengai
Sagalim
Salamdiri
Salgas
Sangaldipa
Saraidih
Saraiya
Sarauna
Sarjamatu
Sirma
Sons
Sorath
Sunri
Surjaun
Surjaun
Taiya
Tal
Taledih
Tarwadih
Tatidiri
Tetariadih
Tetrain
Thekhi
Tilamba
Titlangi
Tola Chatti
Tola Manran
Tunudag
Uchahra Kalan
Uchahra Khurd
Udih
Uksu
Ulgara

Languages 

Languages spoken in Panki include Asuri, an Austroasiatic language, and Bhojpuri, a tongue in the Bihari language group written in both the Devanagari and Kaithi scripts.

Facilities

Education
 P.H.N Girls High School
 Rajya Samposit Uchh Vidyalay (S S High School Panki)
 Rajkiye Buniyadi Ms Panki School 
 Sarswati Sishu Mandir Panki
 Siksha Niketan
 Upgovernment Primary School Darjahi
 Govt Urdu Ps Panki Bazar
 MK College, Panki, Jharkhand

Hospital 
There are many private hospitals and a government hospital on the main road of Panki.

Market 

A small market called Panki Bazaar is situated in middle of the block, 2 kilometers away from Panki's administrative building.

Police Station 

A police station is situated at the center of Panki.

Bank 

State Bank of Panki (SBIN0003551) is situated at the center of Panki with an ATM facility open during the day.
Punjab national Bank (PUNB0265100) is situated at the near of Panki with an ATM facility open during the day.

Post Office 

There is a post office nearby Panki Market, where speed post, parcel and other postal services are available.

Bike Show Rooms 
There is a Honda showroom which name Sonali Honda for two-wheelers near Thana Road. There is also a Bajaj showroom Named Sonali Bajaj. A Hero showroom was inaugurated in 2018 named Milan Automobiles. And the last TVS showroom which is named Rajdeo Auto.

This information is feed by indian automobile registration license authority.

See also
 Panki Assembly
 Palamu Loksabha constituency
 Jharkhand Legislative Assembly
 Jharkhand
 Palamu

References

Blocks of Palamu district

Community development blocks in Jharkhand
Community development blocks in Palamu district